is a railway station in Mooka, Tochigi Prefecture, Japan, operated by the Mooka Railway.

Lines
Nishidai Station is a station on the Mooka Line, and is located 21.2 rail kilometers from the terminus of the line at Shimodate Station.

Station layout
Nishidai Station has two opposed side platforms connected to the station building by a level crossing. The station is unattended.

History
Nishidai Station opened on 11 July  1913 as a station on the Japanese Government Railway, which subsequently became the Japanese National Railways (JNR). The station was absorbed into the JR East network upon the privatization of the JNR on 1 April 1987, and the Mooka Railway from 11 April 1988. A new station building was completed in March 1998.

Surrounding area
Japan National Route 294
Mooka Nishidai Post Office

References

External links

 Mooka Railway Station information 

Railway stations in Tochigi Prefecture
Railway stations in Japan opened in 1913
Mooka, Tochigi